Pasquale Passarelli (born 14 March 1957) is a retired Italian-born German wrestler who competed in the Greco-Roman bantamweight division. He won a world and a European title in 1981 and an Olympic gold medal in 1984. He missed the 1980 Olympics due to their boycott by West Germany.

Passarelli was born in Italy, and moved to West Germany at the age of five. He retired after the 1984 Olympics, and later worked as a real estate agent in Southern Germany. Between 2001 and 2005 he coached wrestlers at the club KSV Berghausen. His brothers Claudio and Thomas are also retired competitive wrestlers.

References

External links
 

1957 births
Living people
German male sport wrestlers
Olympic wrestlers of West Germany
Wrestlers at the 1984 Summer Olympics
Olympic gold medalists for West Germany
Olympic medalists in wrestling
Medalists at the 1984 Summer Olympics
Italian emigrants to Germany
European Wrestling Championships medalists
World Wrestling Championships medalists
Sportspeople from Ludwigshafen